Jacques Lippens (25 November 1913 – 1994) was a Belgian sailor. He competed in the Dragon event at the 1948 Summer Olympics.

References

External links
 

1913 births
1994 deaths
Belgian male sailors (sport)
Olympic sailors of Belgium
Sailors at the 1948 Summer Olympics – Dragon
Sportspeople from Ghent